Scarlett Mew Jensen (born 31 December 2001) is a British diver. She competed in the women's 1 metre springboard event at the 2019 World Aquatics Championships. She finished in 19th place in the preliminary round. In the women's 3 metre springboard event she finished in 26th place in the preliminary round.

References

External links
 
 

2001 births
Living people
British female divers
Place of birth missing (living people)
Divers at the 2020 Summer Olympics
Olympic divers of Great Britain